Richard Tamale Kiwanuka (born November 11, 1973)) is a former Ugandan defender, and footballer manager who handled Kenyan Premier League sides Nairobi City Stars and Muhoroni Youth F.C. in 2016.

He previously coached Ugandan sides Lira United, Entebbe FC, Kampala Kids League (KKL), Bunamwaya, Kajjansi United and Uganda Premier League side Paidha Black Angels FC.

References

External links
 

1973 births
Living people
Expatriate football managers in Kenya
Football managers in Kenya
Kenyan football managers